James Edwin Ray (born August 25, 1941) was a United States Air Force officer and fighter pilot. He was awarded the Silver Star for his selflessness and courage in the face of great danger.

Biography
James E. Ray graduated from Texas A&M University in 1964. For two years, he flew F-105 fighter bombers in the U.S. Air Force.  On his 11th combat mission, on May 8, 1966, Ray had to eject over North Vietnam and was immediately captured. He was decorated for his resistance to his captors and developing techniques for his fellow prisoners to resist his captors. He was not released until February 12, 1973.

Awards and decorations

References

External links

POW Network entry

1941 births
Vietnam War prisoners of war
United States Air Force officers
Shot-down aviators
American torture victims
Living people
Recipients of the Air Medal
Recipients of the Silver Star
Recipients of the Legion of Merit
Texas A&M University alumni